Sprague may refer to:

Places 
Canada
 Sprague, Manitoba, a small town near the Minnesota/Manitoba border
United States
 Sprague, Alabama in Montgomery County, Alabama
 Sprague, Connecticut
 Sprague, Missouri
 Sprague, Nebraska
 Sprague, Washington
 Sprague, West Virginia
 Sprague, Wisconsin
 Sprague Field, on the campus of Montclair State University in New Jersey
 Sprague Lake (Rocky Mountain National Park, Colorado)
 Sprague River (Maine)
 Sprague River (Oregon)

People

First name
 Sprague Cleghorn, former NHL hockey player
 Sprague Grayden, American actress (born 1980)

Middle name
 L. Sprague de Camp, author

Surname
 Achsa W. Sprague (1827–1862), American spiritualist
 Bud Sprague (1904–1973), American football player
 Burr Sprague (1836-1917), American politician
 Carl T. Sprague (1895-1979), American country musician
 Charles Sprague (disambiguation)
 Clifton Sprague (1896–1955), American admiral during World War II
 David Sprague (1910–1968), Canadian footballer
 E. Carleton Sprague (1822–1895), American lawyer and politician
 Ed Sprague Sr. (1945–2020) American baseball pitcher
 Ed Sprague Jr. (born 1967), American baseball third baseman
 Edward Spragge (AKA Spragg or Sprague,  162073), Irish admiral of the Royal Navy
 Elmer Sprague, American philosopher
 Erik Sprague (born 1972), American freak show and sideshow performer
 Ernest Sprague (1865–1938), American football player, public official, and engineer
 Ernest Headly Sprague (1859–1945), English architect, engineer, teacher, author
 Frank J. Sprague (1857–1934), American naval officer and inventor, notable for development of electric machinery
 Frank Lee Sprague (1958–2018), American guitarist and composer
 Franklin B. Sprague (1825–1895), American military officer, businessman, and judge
 George Sprague (1871–1963), American businessman and mayor of Dallas
 Homer Sprague (1829–1918), American military officer, author, and educator 
 Isaac Sprague (1811–1895), American botanical illustrator
 Isaac W. Sprague (1841–1887), American sideshow performer
 J. Russell Sprague (1886–1969), American politician
 Jack Sprague (born 1964), American racing driver
 Jake Sprague (born 1984), American rugby union player
 Jo Ann Sprague (born 1931), former Massachusetts State Representative and State Senator
 John Allison Sprague (1844–1907), Ontario farmer and politician
 John W. Sprague (1817–1894), American soldier and railroad executive
 Ken Sprague (born 1945), American bodybuilder, businessman, and schoolteacher
 Ken Sprague (cartoonist) (1927–2004), English political cartoonist
 Lucian Sprague, American railroad executive
 Lucy J. Sprague (1851–1903), American suffragist
 Lucy Sprague Mitchell (1878–1967), American educator, writer, college dean
 Martyn Sprague (born 1949), Welsh former footballer
 M. Estella Sprague (1870–1940), American home economist and academic administrator
 Peleg Sprague (Maine politician) (1793–1880), American politician and judge
 Peleg Sprague (New Hampshire politician) (1756–1800), American politician
 Peter Sprague (born 1955), American jazz musician
 Richard E. Sprague (1921–1996), American computer technician, researcher and author
 Robert C. Sprague (1900–1991), American Air Force Undersecretary, inventor and founder of Sprague Electric
 Roderick Sprague (born 1933), American anthropologist, ethnohistorian and historical archaeologist
 R. B. Sprague (1937–2010), American artist
 Roland Sprague (1894–1967), German mathematician
 Royal Sprague, 11th Chief Justice of the Supreme Court of California
 Thomas Archibald Sprague (1877–1958), Scottish botanist
 Thomas Bond Sprague (1830–1920), British actuary
 Thomas L. Sprague, American vice admiral in World War II
 William Sprague (disambiguation)
 W. G. R. Sprague, London theatre designer

Other uses
 Sprague (towboat), a former steamwheeler towboat
 Howard Sprague, a fictional character in the television series The Andy Griffith Show and Mayberry R.F.D.
 Ted Sprague, a fictional character in the television series Heroes
 Sprague Electric, an electronic component maker, best known for making capacitors, acquired in 1992 by Vishay Intertechnology

See also
 Spragg (disambiguation)
 Spragge (disambiguation)